Huntingdon East railway station served the town of Huntingdon, Cambridgeshire, England from 1883 to 1959.

History 
The station opened on 1 May 1883 by the Great Northern and Great Eastern Joint Railway. It was situated east of the present Huntingdon railway station. There was another station that was built in 1850 which was called Huntingdon but when this station opened the original station was renamed Godmanchester to avoid confusion. The station was renamed Huntingdon East on 1 July 1923. The station closed to passengers on 15 June 1959 and goods traffic on 18 September 1959 after the Huntingdon to St. Ives line closed, although military trains and excursions continued to serve the station in the 1960s.

References

External links 

Disused railway stations in Cambridgeshire
Former Great Northern and Great Eastern Joint Railway stations
Railway stations in Great Britain opened in 1883
Railway stations in Great Britain closed in 1959
1883 establishments in England
1959 disestablishments in England